The Glasgow Railroad Bridge is four-span through truss bridge over the Missouri River belonging to the Kansas City Southern railroad between Howard County, Missouri and Saline County, Missouri. It is considered to be the first All Steel Bridge made in the world.

It was originally built in 1878-79 by Gen. William Sooy Smith for the Chicago and Alton railroad as a five-span Whipple through truss and described as the world's first all-steel bridge. In 1900 it was rebuilt with Parker truss spans.  Its previous owner was Gateway Western.  It was damaged in the Great Flood of 1993.

See also
List of crossings of the Missouri River

References
Bridgehunter.com profile

Buildings and structures in Chariton County, Missouri
Buildings and structures in Saline County, Missouri
Bridges completed in 1879
Kansas City Southern Railway bridges
Alton Railroad
Railroad bridges in Missouri
Steel bridges in the United States
Parker truss bridges in the United States
Bridges over the Missouri River